The Snob's Dictionary is a series of books by Vanity Fair contributing writer David Kamp that gently satirizes snobbery (cinephilia (Film Snob), rock music (Rock Snob), winery (Wine Snob)  and fine cuisine (Food Snob)) which soon became a video series with some episodes narrated by actor Judah Friedlander.

Summary
An inside look into cultural snobs whose knowledge of the said subjects are more important than enjoying them.

Examples
Jonas Mekas: "Lithuanian-born, New York-based overlord of avant-garde film"
Jangle: "Critic-beloved noun-adjective used to evoke sunny guitar pop"
Harlan Estate: "Ultimate cult winery, located in Napa and founded by real-estate developer and snob manipulator Bill Harlan"
Geoduck: "Giant saltwater clam with alarmingly phallic siphon that hangs, John Holmes-like, out of its open shell"
Hammer Films: "British production company that, in its factory-like production of blood-soaked, décolletage-heavy horror flicks from the 50s to the 70s, was an overseas cousin to the United States AIP, only with a better roster of actors.
Badfinger: "Ill-started power pop quartet signed to the Beatles' Apple Records under the aegis of mentor Paul McCartney, who saw them as the heirs to his rupturing group--a patently flawed premise nevertheless embraced today by Revisionist Snobs."
Lester Bangs: "Dead rock critic canonized for his willfully obnoxious, amphetamine-streaked prose."

See also
Film criticism
Sideways-the 2004 Oscar-winning Alexander Payne film about California wine tasters
Rockism and poptimism
New Hollywood
Cult film

References

External links
 Homepage
 Playlist on YouTube
 Kamp's humor articles A TV Snob's Dictionary and  The Pro Football Snob's Dictionary Vol. 2 on Vanity Fair

Books about film
Books about rock music
Books about food and drink
Books about wine
Comedy books